Liang Guihua is a Chinese cyclist. He won the gold medal at the Men's C2 3000 meter individual pursuit event at the 2016 Summer Paralympics with 3:44.553. He also won the bronze medal at the Men's road time trial C2 event, with 28:17.77.

References

Living people
Cyclists at the 2016 Summer Paralympics
Medalists at the 2016 Summer Paralympics
Paralympic gold medalists for China
Paralympic cyclists of China
Chinese male cyclists
Paralympic bronze medalists for China
Year of birth missing (living people)
Paralympic medalists in cycling
Medalists at the 2020 Summer Paralympics
Cyclists at the 2020 Summer Paralympics
21st-century Chinese people